Sergio Girardi (born March 26, 1946 in Belfiore) is a retired Italian professional football player.

References

1946 births
Living people
Italian footballers
Serie A players
Mantova 1911 players
Inter Milan players
Palermo F.C. players
Genoa C.F.C. players
Ravenna F.C. players
Association football goalkeepers